Accuminulia buscki is a species of moth of the family Tortricidae described by John W. Brown in 2000. It is found in Chile. The species was first recorded as an interception at the Port of New York in a shipment of grapes from Chile.

The length of the forewings is 6.5–8 mm for males and 6–7 mm for females. The forewings are whitish tan, with irregular gray, brown and cream overscaling and irrorations (speckling). The hindwings are dingy white, with pale gray overscaling and mottling. Adults have been recorded on wing from October to April.

Larvae have been reared from the fruit of grape Vitis species, Prunus domestica, Prunus armeniaca and Prunus persica. They bore into the fruit of their host plant. It is not thought to be an introduced pest in Chile, but a native species that has expanded its food plant range to include agricultural plants.

Etymology
The species is named in honour of microlepidopterist August Busck.

References

Moths described in 2000
Euliini
Fauna of Chile
Moths of South America
Endemic fauna of Chile